Surtees is a surname derived from "sur-Tees" or "sur-Tays".  The name originates from the rivers Tees (Northern England) or Tay,  Scotland and most likely originates from the Anglo-Norman nobility's practice of naming yourself after where you have settled. "Sur" is a French conjunction meaning "upon" or "from" and be found in the word surname as well as many French placenames like Vic-sur-Aisne.

Variants
Variants include Surtes, Surties, Suyrtayse, Surteys.

People
Notable people with this surname include:
 Allan Surtees (1924–2000), English actor
 Aubone Surtees (1865–1923), English rugby union footballer
 Bruce Surtees (1937–2012), American cinematographer
 Charles Surtees (1823–1906), English politician
 Henry Surtees (1991–2009), British racing driver
 Jack Surtees (1911–1992), English professional footballer
 John Surtees (1934–2017), English former Grand Prix motorcycle road racer and Formula One driver
 Nicholas Surtees (born 1977), Scottish rugby player
 Robert Smith Surtees (1803–1864), English writer 
 Robert Surtees (antiquarian) (1779–1834), historian and antiquarian
 Robert Surtees (cinematographer) (1906–1985), American cinematographer
 Schlitze Surtees (1901–1971), American sideshow performer and actor
 William Surtees (1871–1956), English Anglican bishop

References